George Johnston (born 21 March 1947) is a Scottish former professional footballer who played as a forward. He played more than 150 matches in the English Football League.

Life and career
Johnston was born in Glasgow. He began his football career as a junior at Cardiff City, turning professional in 1964 and making his debut at the end of the 1964–65 season at the age of 17. He was part of Cardiff's 1965 Welsh Cup-winning team. The following year he settled into the side and, playing alongside the likes of John Charles and John Toshack, he finished as the club's top scorer with a total of 23 goals. In March 1967, Johnston played in a benefit match for victims of the Aberfan disaster against Arsenal and scored twice against the London club, which persuaded them to offer £20,000 to Cardiff to sign him.

He made his debut for Arsenal on 19 August 1967, against Stoke City, and made 17 appearances in his first season, 1967-68. However, he could not hold down a place in 1968–69 and was dropped to the reserves, where he won a Football Combination winners' medal. Out of the Arsenal first team, he joined Second Division club Birmingham City in the summer of 1969, for a fee of £30,000. He made 25 appearances and scored 3 goals for Arsenal.

Signed as a replacement for Fred Pickering, Johnston failed to hold down a first-team place. A period on loan at Walsall immediately preceded a £6,000 move to Fulham, where he spent two years. A season with Hereford United followed, and one more with Newport County, before, at the age of just 26, he dropped out of league football.

He later settled in Cardiff and worked for a marine engineering company.

Honours
Cardiff City
Welsh Cup: 1965

References

1947 births
Living people
Footballers from Glasgow
Scottish footballers
Association football forwards
Cardiff City F.C. players
Arsenal F.C. players
Birmingham City F.C. players
Walsall F.C. players
Fulham F.C. players
Hereford United F.C. players
Newport County A.F.C. players
English Football League players